María Mercedes Coroy (born September 3, 1994) is a Guatemalan actress of Kaqchikel Maya descent. She is known for her roles in Ixcanul, La Llorona, Bel Canto, Malinche, and Black Panther: Wakanda Forever.

Early life 
Coroy was born and raised in Santa María de Jesús, Guatemala. She speaks Kaqchikel Mayan as well as Spanish and some Poqomam Mayan.

In 2016, she graduated from University of San Carlos de Guatemala with a degree in acting.

Career 
She was discovered via a casting call by Jayro Bustamante, and acted in two of Bustamante's films, Ixcanul and La Llorona.

At the 2019 Venice Film Festival, she wore a typical Quetzaltenango costume.

In 2022, she joined the Marvel Cinematic Universe by appearing in Black Panther: Wakanda Forever where she played Namor's mother.

References 

1994 births
Guatemalan film actresses
Living people
Universidad de San Carlos de Guatemala alumni
People from Sacatepéquez Department
21st-century Guatemalan actresses